Aruldoss  is an Indian actor who has appeared in supporting roles in predominantly Tamil language films. Prior to focusing on an acting career, he worked as a cinematographer for several films.

Career
After completing school, Aruldoss worked as a photographer at weddings. Through his acquaintances, he managed to get a breakthrough into the Tamil film industry and served as an assistant cinematographer in Sundar C's Arunachalam (1997). He subsequently went on to work as the main cameraman in A Aa E Ee (2009) and Pathinaaru (2009).

Aruldoss has often collaborated as an actor with film maker Suseenthiran, after making his debut in Naan Mahaan Alla (2010) and appearing in Azhagarsamiyin Kuthirai (2011), Rajapattai (2011) and Paayum Puli (2015). His close friendship with Seenu Ramasamy has meant that Aruldoss has also played roles in Thenmerku Paruvakaatru (2010), Neerparavai (2012) and Idam Porul Yaeval (2016). He has also appeared in acclaimed films including Soodhu Kavvum (2013), Thanga Meengal (2013) and Papanasam (2015).

During the making of Ponmaalai Pozhudhu (2013), Aruldoss slapped the actress Gayathrie by mistake. He subsequently made a public apology for his actions.

Filmography

Films

Cinematographer

Web series

References

External links

Indian male film actors
Living people
Male actors from Madurai
Tamil male actors
Male actors in Tamil cinema
Tamil film cinematographers
Cinematographers from Tamil Nadu
Year of birth missing (living people)